WRVL (88.3 MHz) is a non-commercial radio station licensed to Lynchburg, Virginia, serving the New River Valley.  WRVL is owned and operated by Liberty University and was founded by Jerry Falwell.  It broadcasts a Christian Contemporary radio format known as "The Journey."  The station is listener-supported and holds periodic fundraisers on the air.  The studios and offices are on Candlers Mountain Road in Lynchburg.

WRVL has an effective radiated power (ERP) of 28,000 watts.  The transmitter is on Uphill Trail in Altavista.  Programming is also simulcast on 19 rebroadcasters and FM translators in Virginia and North Carolina.

History

Early years
It had been powered at 100,000 watts, the maximum for most FM stations in the U.S. but on a shorter tower than it uses today. It originally broadcast Christian talk and teaching programs, including those of founder and televangelist Jerry Falwell, who started Liberty University. WRVL faced a series of technical problems in its early years revolving around interference to television reception near the station site. 

In December 1981, the Federal Communications Commission ordered the station to greatly reduce its effective radiated power (ERP) from 100,000 to 5,000 watts. In 1982, its tower was brought down by vandals.  While the station was off the air, viewers reported better reception of WDBJ Channel 7, the CBS network affiliate for Roanoke-Lynchburg.  WRVL later moved to a new tower in Altavista, reducing interference with Channel 7.

WVTW subchannel
In 2009, WRVL broke ground by forming a partnership with NPR broadcaster 89.1 WVTW, owned by Virginia Tech University.  This allowed WRVL to repeat Victory FM programming on WVTW's HD-3 digital subchannel in Charlottesville, Virginia. This is noteworthy because it makes WVTW perhaps one of few HD radio stations in the nation funded by the federal Public Telecommunications Facilities Program (PTFP).

On December 26, 2014, WRVL dropped nearly all its Christian talk and teaching programs, switching to a Contemporary Christian music format.  The station's moniker also changed from "Victory Radio Network" to "The Journey".  It uses the slogan "Life, Hope, Music."

Simulcasts
"The Journey" is carried on several stations and HD Radio digital subchannels in Virginia and North Carolina.

Notes:

Translators
"The Journey" is relayed by additional translators to widen its broadcast area. W236BO at 95.1 served Burlington, North Carolina prior to 2013, until WPCM took it over.

References

External links
 The Journey Online
 

1981 establishments in Virginia
Contemporary Christian radio stations in the United States
RVL
Radio stations established in 1981
RVL
WRVL
Lynchburg, Virginia